

This is a list of the National Register of Historic Places listings in Marin County, California.

This is intended to be a complete list of the properties and districts on the National Register of Historic Places in Marin County, California, United States. Latitude and longitude coordinates are provided for many National Register properties and districts; these locations may be seen together in an online map.

There are 53 properties and districts listed on the National Register in the county, including 4 National Historic Landmarks.

Current listings

An old railroad bridge along the Northwestern Pacific right of way that is now a road bridge. It is one of 5 such bridge types in California.

|}

See also

List of National Historic Landmarks in California
National Register of Historic Places listings in California
California Historical Landmarks in Marin County, California

References

Marin
San Francisco Bay Area-related lists